Sir Edward Hamilton was a merchant ship launched at Rotherhithe in 1800. The British East India Company (EIC) chartered her in 1800 to bring rice from Bengal. She then proceeded to sail as a West Indiaman and later across the Atlantic, finally to the Baltic. She grounded in December 1853 and was so damaged that apparently she never sailed again.

Career
Weather-induced crop failures in Britain in 1799 and 1800 forced the British Government to import rice from Bengal to counter popular unrest. The wheat harvests of 1799 and 1800 were about one-half and three-quarters of the average, respectively. The price of bread rose sharply, leading to bread riots; some of rioters invoked the French Revolution.

Because the British East India Company (EIC) had a legal monopoly on all trade between Britain and India, the Government had to have the EIC engage the transport vessels. The EIC chartered 28 vessels, Sir Edward Hamilton among them.

Captain Andrew Robertson acquired a letter of marque on 29 November 1800. He sailed from Portsmouth on 9 January 1801, bound for Bengal. Sir Edward Hamilton arrived at Calcutta on 26 May. Homeward bound, she was at Diamond Harbour on 1 September,  Kedgeree on 15 September, and the Cape on 23 December. She reached St Helena on 28 January 1802 and arrived back at Portsmouth on 30 March.<ref>[http://searcharchives.bl.uk/IAMS_VU2:IAMS045-001115741 British Library: 'Sir Edward Hamilton.]</ref>

In 1830 a new owner, T. Ward, of Hull, changed Sir Edward Hamiltons homeport to Hull. She started sailing between Hull and Quebec.

On 2 May 1833 Maybud sprang a leak and her crew abandoned her in the North Sea while on a voyage from Sunderland, County Durham to Aldeburgh. Sir Edward Hamilton rescued the crew.

Fate
On 31 May 1853 Sir Edward Hamilton and Canton were in company while sailing from Hull to Saint Petersburg when they grounded on Anholt. They were assisted off and were to proceed on their voyages.Sir Edward Hamilton'' was returning from Saint Petersburg when she was driven ashore on 2 December 1853 at Flamborough Head. She was refloated on 4 December and taken in to Bridlington in a severely leaky condition. Part of her cargo and stores were removed and her masts cut down. Still, she filled with water at every tide.

Notes

Citations

References
 
 

1800 ships
Ships built in Rotherhithe
Ships of the British East India Company
Age of Sail merchant ships of England
Maritime incidents in May 1833
Maritime incidents in December 1853